Vecherniye Vesti (lit. 'The Evening News'), founded in 1999, is a Russian language Kyiv-based Ukrainian tabloid newspaper with a circulation of 530,000. It was fiercely critical of then-President Leonid Kuchma and his administration. The paper is controlled by the former Prime Minister Yulia Tymoshenko, a prominent critic of Kuchma.

External links
Vecherniya Vesti online

Publications established in 1999
Russian-language newspapers published in Ukraine
Mass media in Kyiv